Wygodzinskilis is a genus of jumping bristletails in the family Machilidae. There is at least one described species in Wygodzinskilis, W. klinocellata.

References

Further reading

 
 
 
 
 

Archaeognatha
Articles created by Qbugbot